Briceida Cuevas, also known as Briceida Cuevas Cob (born Tepakán, Calkiní, Campeche, Mexico, July 12, 1969) is a Mayan poet. She writes poems about everyday life in Yucatec Maya, many of which have been translated into Spanish, French and English. She is a member of Escritores en Lenguas Indigenas A.C., and a corresponding member of the Academia Mexicana de la Lengua.

Selected works 

 Flor y canto: cinco poetas indígenas del sur, INI/UNESCO, Tabasco, 1993.
In pákat yétel júntul t'el: Tumbén Ikʼtʼanil ich Mayaʼ Tʼan (Poesía contemporánea en lengua maya), España, 1994.
U yokʼol auat pekʼ (El quejido del perro en su existencia), Casa Internacional del Escritor, Quintana Roo, 1995.
Jeʼ bix kʼin (Como el sol), 1998.
 Las lenguas de América. Recital de poesía, UNAM, La Pluralidad Cultural en México, 2005.
 Voci di Antiche Radici, dieci poeti indigeni del Méssico, Trieste, Italia, 2005.
Tiʼ u billil in nookʼ /Del dobladillo de mi ropa, 2008.
U t'íibta'al cháak : u múuch ts'íibil ik'il t'aano'ob yéetel tsikbalo'ob ich Maya yétel kaselan = Escribiendo la lluvia : antología literaria en lengua maya-español. Campeche, 2012.
Lenguas de Mexico: Maya (audio poetry reading by Briceida Cuevas Cob), 2019.

Selected works translated into English 

 Four poems by Briceida Cuevas Cob (from U yok’ol auat pek’ ti kuxtal pek’, [The growl of the dog in its existence]
Two Poems [Kite and Owl]
School

References 

1969 births
Living people
20th-century Mexican poets
Mayan-language poets
People from Campeche